Robert or Bob Woods may refer to:

Entertainment
 Robert Woods (actor) (born 1936), American actor in European films
 Robert S. Woods (born 1948), American actor
 Robert Woods (producer), classical music producer

Sports
 Robert Woods (offensive tackle) (born 1950), former NFL offensive lineman
 Robert Woods (wide receiver, born 1992), American football player who is currently a free agent
 Robert Woods (wide receiver, born 1955), former NFL wide receiver
 Robert Woods (cyclist) (born 1968), Australian mountain bike racer
 Robert Woods (coach) (1887–1949), American football coach and mayor of Athens, Ohio
 Bob Woods (curler) (Robert Woods, born 1933), Canadian-Swedish curler
 Bob Woods (ice hockey), Canadian ice hockey coach and player

Other
 Robert Woods (surgeon) (1865–1938), Irish surgeon, UK MP 1918–1922
 Robert Carr Woods (1816–1875), lawyer and editor of The Straits Times
 Robert John Woods (1859–1944), Ontario farmer and political figure
 Robin Woods (Robert Wilmer Woods, 1914–1997), English Anglican bishop
 Bob Woods (politician) (Robert Leslie Woods, born 1947), Australian former politician

See also
 Robert Wood (disambiguation)